Frank Karlitschek (born 25 July 1973) is a German open source software developer living in Stuttgart, Germany.

Karlitschek argues on his blog that "Privacy is the foundation of democracy." He says that people should have a basic right "to control their own data in the Internet age."

Free software 
Karlitschek is a KDE contributor since 2001 when he mainly worked in web community and artist team. He is a member of the KDE e.V. since 2003. In summer 2009 he was elected as a board member and vice president of KDE e.V.

In 2001, Karlitschek started KDE-Look.org. At Akademy 2008, Karlitschek presented the vision of the Social Desktop for the KDE project. Karlitschek further started the Open-PC and the Open Collaboration Services projects. He is also a cohost of RadioTux, the biggest German Linux Podcast. In 2012, Karlitschek started the User Data Manifesto initiative.

Karlitschek gives keynotes at conferences like LinuxCon, Latinoware, openSUSE Conf, and Akademy.

ownCloud 
In 2010, Karlitschek started the ownCloud project during a CampKDE keynote and released the version 1.0 in June 2010. He was the project leader and maintainer.

In 2011, Karlitschek co-founded ownCloud Inc. to offer an enterprise version of ownCloud. He served as the CTO and oversaw the product development and community relations.

In April 2016, Karlitschek left ownCloud Inc.

Nextcloud
In June 2016, five weeks after leaving ownCloud, he started Nextcloud, a fork of ownCloud.

References

External links

Nextcloud
KDE
Free software programmers
German computer programmers
1973 births
Living people